John Saint Ryan (born 1953) is an English actor, horse trainer and equestrian. He has appeared in supporting roles in film and television. His more memorable characters include Fergus in the 1997 Fox television series Roar and Myles Standish in Disney's 1994 adventure drama film Squanto: A Warrior's Tale.

Early life 
Born John Barker in Burnley, Lancashire, he attended Rosehill Junior School and later became a bookseller and martial arts teacher in the town.
He ran and instructed a Muay Thai gym in Preston called fighting fit prior to getting a role as a stunt double for Sean Connery on the film set 'The Medicine Man'

Career 
Ryan made his acting debut in 1983 in G.B.H. and soon landed a small role in the hit British soap opera Emmerdale (then known as Emmerdale Farm) as Jameson. Ryan appeared in theatre productions of Far from the Madding Crowd and A Streetcar Named Desire, and in supporting roles in films and television series including Coronation Street (as Charlie Whelan), Buffy the Vampire Slayer, General Hospital, Murder, She Wrote, Cybill, and the made-for-TV movie The Heidi Chronicles. Ryan also played the main antagonist Cyborg in American Cyborg: Steel Warrior.

Ryan moved to California in the early 1990s. He owns and operates the Red Rose Ranch, a working horse and cattle ranch near Inyokern, California, where he raises, boards, and sells horses. He trains horses and riders in both dressage and western riding; Ryan's specialty is the doma vaquera style of western riding, a Spanish form of competitive Western pleasure riding. He has won multiple national and international titles in the sport, and he has written books and produced videos on the doma vaquera style.

Personal life
Saint Ryan married Joyce and has three sons. One of whom, Samuel Barker (born 1980), is a lighting director and has won Emmy Awards for his work on The Voice (American TV series). Saint Ryan is a keen supporter of Burnley Football Club.

Filmography

Film

Television

References

External links 
 
 Red Rose Ranch homepage

Living people
English male film actors
English male television actors
English male equestrians
1953 births
English expatriates in the United States
People from Burnley
Male actors from Lancashire